Example may refer to:  

 exempli gratia (e.g.), usually read out in English as "for example"
 .example, reserved as a domain name that may not be installed as a top-level domain of the Internet
 example.com, example.net, example.org, example.edu, second-level domain names reserved for use in documentation as examples
 HMS Example (P165), an Archer-class patrol and training vessel of the Royal Navy

Arts
 The Example, a 1634 play by James Shirley
 The Example (comics), a 2009 graphic novel by Tom Taylor and Colin Wilson
 Example (musician), the British dance musician Elliot John Gleave (born 1982)
 Example (album), a 1995 album by American rock band For Squirrels

See also 
 

 Exemplar (disambiguation), a prototype or model which others can use to understand a topic better
 Exemplum, medieval collections of short stories to be told in sermons
 Eixample, an inner suburb of Barcelona with distinctive architecture